Siobhan-Marie O'Connor (born 29 November 1995) is a former English competitive swimmer who has represented Great Britain at the Olympic Games, the FINA World Aquatics Championships and the LEN European Aquatics Championships, and England at the Commonwealth Games. A specialist in the 200 metres individual medley, she is the 2014 and 2018 Commonwealth Games champion in the event, and has won silver medals in the same event at the 2016 Summer Olympics, the 2015 World Aquatics Championships, 2016 European Aquatics Championships, the 2014 World Short-Course Championships and the 2013 and 2015 European Short Course Championships – on each occasion behind World and Olympic champion Katinka Hosszú. With six Commonwealth Games medals in total from 2014, O'Connor was England's most decorated athlete at those Games.

In addition, O'Connor swam the butterfly leg for Great Britain in the non-Olympic 4 x 100-metre mixed medley relay that won gold at the 2015 FINA World Aquatics Championships in a world record time for the event. she has also won gold medals in 2016 at the European Championships in the same event, and in the women's 4 x 100 metres medley relay.

O'Connor first competed for Great Britain at the 2012 Summer Olympics in the 100m breaststroke event. She holds the British records for 200 metres individual medley, the 100 breaststroke and the 4 x 100-metre mixed medley relay.

O'Connor announced her retirement from competitive swimming on 16 June 2021, following a long battle with ulcerative colitis,

Personal life
O'Connor attended St. Gregory's Catholic College in Bath. She missed her prom to compete in the qualifying meet for the 2012 London Olympics. In 2015, Siobhan was at a Team Bath warm weather training camp at Northern Arizona University at the same time four students were shot by a freshman following an altercation outside a fraternity house, leaving one dead and three wounded. 

O'Connor has ulcerative colitis, a type of inflammatory bowel disease.

See also
 List of Olympic medalists in swimming (women)
 List of World Aquatics Championships medalists in swimming (women)
 List of Commonwealth Games medallists in swimming (women)

References

External links
 
 
 
 
 
 

1995 births
Living people
Commonwealth Games bronze medallists for England
Commonwealth Games silver medallists for England
Commonwealth Games gold medallists for England
English female swimmers
Olympic swimmers of Great Britain
Sportspeople from Bath, Somerset
Swimmers at the 2012 Summer Olympics
Swimmers at the 2014 Commonwealth Games
Swimmers at the 2016 Summer Olympics
Swimmers at the 2018 Commonwealth Games
World Aquatics Championships medalists in swimming
European Aquatics Championships medalists in swimming
Medalists at the FINA World Swimming Championships (25 m)
World record setters in swimming
Olympic silver medallists for Great Britain
Medalists at the 2016 Summer Olympics
Olympic silver medalists in swimming
Commonwealth Games medallists in swimming
Medallists at the 2014 Commonwealth Games
Medallists at the 2018 Commonwealth Games